The 1890 Wisconsin Badgers football team represented the University of Wisconsin as an independent during the 1890 college football season. Led by Ted Mestre in his first and only season as head coach, the Badgers compiled a record of 1–3. The team's captain was James Kerr.

This season marked the largest margin of victory in Wisconsin Badgers football history, a 106–0 win to open the season against . In the second game of the season, the Badgers lost 63–0 to Minnesota, a first game played in the Minnesota–Wisconsin football rivalry, one of the most played college football rivalries.

Schedule

References

Wisconsin
Wisconsin Badgers football seasons
Wisconsin Badgers football